Lobaina is a surname. Notable people with the surname include:

Néstor Rodríguez Lobaina, Cuban activist
Rolando Rodríguez Lobaina (born 1969), Cuban activist